The  is a river that originates in Ōita Prefecture, Japan. After running through the southern and central portions of Ōita Prefecture, it runs through the eastern part of Kumamoto Prefecture and the northern part of Miyazaki Prefecture.

The Hakusui Dam, constructed in 1938, stands on the river.

References

External links
 (mouth)

Rivers of Kumamoto Prefecture
Rivers of Ōita Prefecture
Rivers of Miyazaki Prefecture
Rivers of Japan